Child pornography is illegal in most countries, but there is substantial variation in definitions, categories, penalties, and interpretations of laws. Differences include the definition of "child" under the laws, which can vary with the age of sexual consent; the definition of "child pornography" itself, for example on the basis of medium or degree of reality; and which actions are criminal (e.g. production, distribution, possession, and/or downloading and viewing of material). Laws surrounding fictional child pornography are a major source of variation between jurisdictions; some maintain distinctions in legality between real and fictive pornography depicting minors, while others regulate fictive material under general laws against child pornography.

Several organizations and treaties have set non-binding guidelines (model legislation) for countries to follow. While a country may be a signatory, they may or may not have chosen to implement these guidelines. The information given in this article is subject to change as laws are consistently updated around the world.

International stance

Organizations
International Centre for Missing & Exploited Children (ICMEC)

This organization combats child sexual exploitation, child pornography, and child abduction. For child pornography they have set up "model legislation" which defines child pornography, and sets up recommended sanctions/sentencing. According to research performed in 2018; child pornography is illegal in 118 of the 196 Interpol member states. This figure represents countries that have sufficient legislation in establishing 4 or 5 of 5 criteria met as defined by the ICMEC.

ECPAT International (ECPAT)

ECPAT focuses on halting the online sexual exploitation of children, the trafficking of children for sexual purposes and the sexual exploitation of children in the travel and tourism industry. This organization tracks countries that have implemented standards as defined by agreements such as the Convention on Cybercrime, and Lanzarote Convention through their human rights reports.

Treaties
At least two major treaties are in place with one "optional protocol" to combat child pornography worldwide. These are considered international obligations to pass specific laws against child pornography which should be "punishable by appropriate penalties that take into account their grave nature". The first of these treaties has to do with The Council of Europe's Cybercrime Convention, the Council of Europe Convention on the Protection of Children against Sexual Exploitation and Sexual Abuse, and the EU Framework Decision that became active in 2006. These required signatory or member states to criminalize all aspects of child pornography. The second involves the United Nations which established Article 34 of the United Nations Convention on the Rights of the Child (UNCRC). This stated that all signatories shall take appropriate measures to prevent the exploitative use of children in pornographic performances and materials. An optional protocol was also added that requires signatories to outlaw the "producing, distributing, disseminating, importing, exporting, offering, selling or possessing for the above purposes" of child pornography. Some of the negotiations and reviews of the process took place at the World Congress against Commercial Sexual Exploitation of Children held in 1996 and 2001.

Debate

While laws criminalizing child sexual abuse now exist in all countries of the world, more diversity in law exists on issues such as the exact minimum age of those depicted in pornography, whether the mere possession of child pornography should be a crime, or whether sentences for such possession should be modified. Convictions for possessing child pornography also usually include prison sentences, but those sentences are often converted to probation for first-time offenders.

In 1999, in the case of R. v. Sharpe, British Columbia's highest court struck down a law against possessing child pornography as unconstitutional. That opinion, written by Justice Duncan Shaw, held, "There is no evidence that demonstrates a significant increase in the danger to children caused by pornography", and "A person who is prone to act on his fantasies will likely do so irrespective of the availability of pornography." The Opposition in the Canadian Parliament considered invoking the notwithstanding clause to override the court's ruling. However, it was not necessary because the Canadian Supreme Court overturned the decision with several findings including that viewing such material makes it more likely that the viewer will abuse, that the existence of such materials further hurts the victims as they know of its existence, and that the demand for such images encourages the abuse.

In the United States, some federal judges have argued that the U.S. Sentencing Guidelines' recommended penalties for possessors of child pornography are too harsh. Judge Jack B. Weinstein of New York criticizes the mandatory sentence for possession of child pornography as often higher than the penalty for actually committing the act of child abuse it depicts. Furthermore, child pornography prosecutions have led to dozens of suicides, some of them among the innocently accused. The requirement that people convicted of possessing child pornography pay restitution has been criticized by some judges and law professors. This has been particularly controversial in cases involving millions of dollars of restitution, as in those pertaining to the Misty Series. But in 2010, the US Ninth Circuit Court of Appeals ruled that restitution directly to depicted minors was an appropriate penalty for possession of child pornography.

During the nomination process at the 2008 Libertarian National Convention, anarcho-capitalist and U.S. presidential candidate Mary Ruwart came under fire for her comment in her 1998 book, Short answers to the tough questions, in which she stated her opposition not only to laws against possession of child pornography but even against its production, based on her belief that such laws actually encourage such behavior by increasing prices. Shane Cory, on behalf of the minarchist United States Libertarian Party in his role as executive director, issued a response saying, "We have an obligation to protect children from sexual exploitation and abuse, and we can do this by increasing communication between state and federal agencies to help combat this repulsive industry. While privacy rights should always be respected in the pursuit of child pornographers, more needs to be done to track down and prosecute the twisted individuals who exploit innocent children." Cory resigned after the party refused to vote on a resolution asking states to strongly enforce existing child porn laws.

Status by country

Africa

Asia

Europe

North America

Oceania

South America

See also 
Legal status of fictional pornography depicting minors
List of pornography laws by country

Notes

References

External links 

Child pornography law
Age and society
Law-related lists
Minimum ages
Sexuality and age
Youth rights